The Ultimo Substation is a heritage-listed electrical substation located at 41 Mountain Street in the inner city Sydney suburb of Ultimo in the City of Sydney local government area of New South Wales, Australia. It was built in 1906. It is also known as #5 Mountain Street. The property is owned by Ausgrid, an agency of the Government of New South Wales. It was added to the New South Wales State Heritage Register on 2 April 1999.

History 
The Mountain Street substation is a purpose designed and built structure constructed .

Description 
The Mountain Street substation is an unusual tuck pointed face brick structure on a corner site, designed in the Federation Free Style evidenced by the use of a sandstone window headers, sill detailing and gabled parapet with curvilinear elements and contrasting manganese banded brick parapet. Stylistic elements also include a large arched entrance flanked by a ventilator and a multi paned window in the gabled wall and a pitched roof with exposed rafters. It is located within the /Ultimo Urban Conservation Area. The Mountain Street substation is constructed using load bearing face brick and sandstone block for the parapet. The main entrance is incorporates a brick arch. The windows are multi paned and the main entrance is a steel roller shutter.

The external materials used were face brick, sandstone block, with a steel roller shutter.

Condition 

As at 10 November 2000, the condition of the building was good.

Heritage listing 
As at 10 November 2000, the Mountain Street substation is a rare and early example of an externally intact substation dating from the Federation period.

The Ultimo Substation was listed on the New South Wales State Heritage Register on 2 April 1999.

See also 

Australian non-residential architectural styles
Ausgrid

References

Attribution 

New South Wales State Heritage Register
Ultimo, New South Wales
Electric power infrastructure in New South Wales
Articles incorporating text from the New South Wales State Heritage Register
Energy infrastructure completed in 1906
1906 establishments in Australia